Flicker may refer to:

 Flickers, woodpeckers of the subgenus Colaptes
 Flicker (screen), a change in brightness between frames that occurs on a cathode-ray screen at low refresh rates
 Flicker (light), a directly visible change in brightness of a light source
 Power-line flicker, a fluctuation in the voltage of AC power lines, whose compliance is regulated by IEC61000-3-3
 Flicker noise, electrical noise with a 1/f spectrum.
 Flicker, a guitar tremolo made by ESP Guitars in the late 1970s and early 1980s

People
 Tal Flicker (born 1992), Israeli judoka
 Theodore Flicker (1930–2014), American playwright
 Yuval Flicker (born 1955), American mathematician

Popular culture
 Flicker, the sophomore album by Ayria
 Flicker, the original bass guitarist for the band Manic Street Preachers
 Flicker, a character in the cartoon and video game Blazing Dragons
 Flicker (novel), by Theodore Roszak
 Flicker, a candle maker transformed into a candle man appearing in The Ice King of Oz and subsequent books by Eric Shanower
 Flicker, a 1973 pinball table made by Bally
 Flicker Records, a record label belonging to Sony
 Flicker (album), the debut studio album by Niall Horan, or its title track
 The Flicker, an experimental film created in 1965 by Tony Conrad
 Flicker (film), a 2008 Canadian film
 "Flicker" (song), a song by Porter Robinson from the album Worlds
 "Flicker", a song by Audio Adrenaline from the album Some Kind of Zombie

Slang
 A remote control device (especially for televisions)
 A flyswatter

See also
 Flecker, a surname
 Flicka, a 2006 film based on the book My Friend Flicka
 Flick (disambiguation)
 Flickr, a digital photo sharing website and service